Rory Hayes (born 1996) is an Irish hurler who plays for Clare Senior Championship club Wolfe Tones na Sionna and at inter-county level with the Clare senior hurling team. He usually lines out as a corner-back.

Career

A member of the Wolfe Tones club in Shannon, Hayes first came to hurling prominence with St. Caimin's Community School in the Harty Cup. He later lined out with the University of Limerick in the Fitzgibbon Cup. Hayes first appeared on the inter-county scene as a member of the Clare minor team before later lining out with the under-21 side. He made his debut with the Clare senior hurling team during the 2018 Munster League.

Career statistics

References

1996 births
Living people
Wolfe Tones na Sionna hurlers
Clare inter-county hurlers